Om Thanvi is a Hindi writer, senior journalist, editor and critic. Thanvi is currently the founding vice-chancellor of Haridev Joshi University of Journalism and Mass Communication. His works include work Apne Apne Agyey, and Muanjodaro.

Early life
Om Thanvi was born in the town of Phalodi in Jodhpur district of Rajasthan. His father was an educationalist and editor of two educational journals. He grew up in Bikaner and took his post graduation degree in Business Administration from Rajasthan University.

Career
Thanvi started journalism in his student days in 1977 contributing to weekly Marudeep daily Yugpaksh (Bikaner) and weekly Ravivar (Calcutta). After completing his Masters in Commerce Thanvi started his mainstream journalism in 1978 with Itwari, a weekly paper from the Rajasthan Patrika in Jaipur, Rajasthan. From 1980 to 1989 he worked in Rajasthan Patrika. After this, he joined the Hindi daily Jansatta of the Indian Express Group and was associated with this newspaper for the next twenty-six years (from 1989 to 2015), serving as a journalist, resident editor (Chandigarh edition, 1989―99), and editor (1999―2015).

After separating from the Jansatta, Thanvi taught as a visiting professor at  Jawaharlal Nehru University (JNU) at the Center for Media Studies, School of Social Sciences. He is currently the founding vice-chancellor of Haridev Joshi University of Journalism and Mass Communication, Jaipur (Rajasthan). He is holding additional charge of V-C, MDSU, Ajmer and V-C, Rajasthan State Skills University, Jaipur.

Awards and recognition

 Ganesh Shankar Vidyarthi award, awarded by the Central Institute of Hindi.
 His book Muanjodaro, has received the Bihari Puraskar, awarded by K. K. Birla Foundation.

References

External links
 Om Thanvi, writer introduction, Vani Prakashan.

1957 births
Living people
Writers from Rajasthan
People from Jodhpur district
Hindi-language writers
Indian journalists
Indian editors
Indian essayists